Reveley is a surname. Notable people with the surname include:

Demelza Reveley (born 1991), Australian model who won the fourth cycle of Australia's Next Top Model
Eustace Reveley Mitford (1810–1869), satirical writer, best known as "Pasquin" in the early days of the Colony of South Australia
Henry Willey Reveley (1788–1875), civil engineer at the Swan River Colony, the foundation of the state of Western Australia
Maria Reveley (1770–1836), friend and correspondent of Mary and Percy Bysshe Shelley and William Godwin
Mary Reveley (1940–2017), English racehorse trainer
Willey Reveley (1760–1799), English architect
W. Taylor Reveley II (1917–1992), 18th president of Hampden-Sydney College
W. Taylor Reveley III (born 1943), 27th president of the College of William & Mary
W. Taylor Reveley IV (born 1974), Virginia educator and lawyer, 26th president of Longwood University

See also
Revel (disambiguation)